"Déshabillez-moi" (English: "Undress Me") is a 1967 song first recorded by French singer Juliette Gréco, by Patti Layne in 1987, then by Mylène Farmer in a studio version in 1988 and in a live version during her 2006 concerts at Bercy (Paris). This live version was the second single from Farmer's fourth live album, Avant que l'ombre... à Bercy, and was released on 5 March 2007. Although it was a top ten hit in France, it achieved moderate success in terms of sales and chart performances.

Background and release
The song, written by Robert Nyel and composed by Gaby Verlor, was originally recorded by French singer Juliette Gréco in 1967, and became scandalous at the time. In 1987, when Farmer wrote "Sans contrefaçon" on the edge of a swimming pool along with photographer Elsa Trillat, Gréco's version of "Déshabillez-moi" was played on radio and Trillat performed a comic strip-tease, which gave Farmer the idea to cover the song. Farmer explained : "I ran to the drugstore to buy Juliette Greco's disc. And the next day, we created a new version." "I want to highlight the humorous side of the approach. I have always more liked Barbara than Juliette Greco."

Her new version, totally different from the original one, was first not much appreciated by Gréco who deemed it as too sweet and lacked enough "bitch". The song became the B-side of her 1987 single "Sans contrefaçon" and was later included in the track listing of her second studio album, Ainsi soit je.... Seeing the public was enthusiastic about this cover, Farmer first decided to release it as a single, then abandoned the idea, as Canadian singer Patti Layne released at the same time her own version of the song, a reggae version.

In January 2006, Farmer performed the song during her series of concerts at Bercy. About one year later, while the live DVD of the concert had huge success, "Déshabillez-moi" was officially announced on 26 January 2007 as second single from the live album Avant que l'ombre... à Bercy. This choice was much appreciated by most of Farmer's fans, according to polls taken on various websites about Mylène Farmer which underlined that the song was considered as the best choice for a second live single. On 2 February, the song was aired on radio in its live version for the first time. The promotional CD was sent a few days later to the radio stations, but the song had a poor airplay and was never broadcast on NRJ. Before the CD single's content became known, a rumour had circulated that a new remix of "Je te rends ton amour" would be featured as a second title. That was erroneous, since the second track was "Porno graphique" in the 2006 live version.

"Déshabillez-moi" is available in a studio version on Ainsi soit je... and in a live version on En Concert and Avant que l'ombre... à Bercy.

Lyrics, music and video
The song refers to the nudity of a woman, the latter "asking a man to undress her in different ways". In the album and live versions of the song, Farmer shows that she has humour and plays to "imitate successively the voice of a little girl, a femme fatale, a bourgeois, a managing woman..." Around the end, she yells a huge "Déshabillez-moi", and finishes the song with the words "Et vous / Déshabillez-vous !".

The video was aired on television for the first time on 15 February 2007. It is an excerpt from the 2006 concert film and does not contain new images. Farmer can be seen wearing black clothing, including a bra which seems to be made of feathers, as it can be seen on the single cover.

Promotion and live performances
Farmer performed the song in two television shows in the late 1980s. First, in Les Oscars de la mode, broadcast on TF1 on 21 October 1987 ; at this occasion, Farmer, dressed in a black dress, played with a chair and revealed by mistake one of her breasts. She also performed in Les Uns et les Autres, aired on TF1 on 29 April 1989.

The song was performed during the 1989 and 2006 tours. During one live performance of the song in 1989, Farmer sang with a microphone on a base, and sometimes she pretended to laugh. She wore a restrictive black dress with sleeves that greatly limited her arm movement, effectively a bondage dress. The dress made her unable to undress herself, which explains why she wore it for the song whose title would be translated to English as "undress me". This is only known occasion of Farmer wearing something like that, which was clearly intended to be funny. After a last "Déshabillez-vous !" launched and an explosion of fireworks, a total blackout enabled the singer to leave the stage to take off her dress. According to Florence Rajon, "we may be disappointed by the coldness of the performance, but this song "remains one of the highlights of the concert". About the 2006 live version, author Erwan Chuberre considered the performance as being "energic" and "more rock", adding that "Farmer let herself loose on this song", performing it in a "dynamic, mischievous and playful" way; however, on some shows, she forgot a verse of the song.

Chart performance
The single debuted at a peak of number ten on French SNEP Singles Chart on 10 March 2007, selling 6,369 units. It was thus the 33rd top ten of Farmer in France, which was at the time the record. Like Farmer's previous singles, it dropped the weeks after and stayed for ten weeks in the Top 50, and 17 weeks on the chart. In Belgium (Wallonia), the single was ranked on the Ultratop 40 for five weeks, from 17 March to 21 April, with a peak at number 19 in its second week. In Switzerland, the single appeared for one week, at number 81, on 25 March.

Formats and track listings
These are the formats and track listings of single releases of "Déshabillez-moi", excluding its 1987 release as B-side to the 12" Maxi version of "Sans contrefaçon":

 CD single

 CD single - Promo

 Digital download

Release history

Personnel
These are the credits and the personnel as they appear on the back of the single:
 Robert Nyel — lyrics
 Gaby Verlor — music
 Polydor — recording company
 Intersong — editions
 Claude Gassian — photo
 Henry Neu — design
 Made in the E.U.

Official versions

Charts

References

Notes

External links
  Mylène Farmer — "Déshabillez-moi (live)" All about the song, on Mylene.net

1967 songs
2007 singles
Mylène Farmer songs
Amanda Lear songs
Live singles
Polydor Records singles

fr:Déshabillez-moi (chanson)